The 1st season of Taniec z gwiazdami, the Polish edition of Dancing with the Stars, started on 16 April 2005 and ended on 4 June 2005. It was broadcast by TVN. Magda Mołek and Hubert Urbański were the hosts, and the judges were: Iwona Szymańska-Pavlović, Zbigniew Wodecki, Beata Tyszkiewicz and Piotr Galiński.

Couples

Scores

Red numbers indicate the lowest score for each week.
Green numbers indicate the highest score for each week.
 indicates the couple eliminated that week.
 indicates the returning couple that finished in the bottom two.
 indicates the winning couple of the week.
 indicates the runner-up of the week.

Notes:
Week 1: Klaudia Carlos scored 36 out of 40 for their first dances and it was the highest score in Week 1. Anna Korcz got 18 points for her Waltz, making it the lowest score of the week and this season. There was no elimination this week.

Week 2: Witold Paszt got 36 points for the Quickstep and it was the highest score in Week 2. Anna Korcz made the biggest weekly improvement in 1st season, after scoring 12 points more than in Week 1. Robert Kudelski got 26 points for his Rumba, making it the lowest score of the week. Robert & Agnieszka were eliminated.

Week 3: Klaudia Carlos was on top of the leaderboard, having 36 points for her Jive. Olivier Janiak got 32 points for his Tango, making it the lowest score of the week. Agnieszka & Michał were eliminated.

Week 4: Katarzyna Skrzynecka got the first perfect score in the history of the show for her Paso Doble. Witold Paszt and Anna Korcz got 24 points for their dances, making it the lowest score of the week. Klaudia & Rafał were eliminated.

Week 5: Katarzyna Skrzynecka scored 39 points for her Samba and was on the top of the leaderboard. Witold Paszt made another biggest weekly improvement in 1st season, after scoring 12 points more than in Week 4. Andrzej Nejman got 28 points for his Samba, making it the lowest score of the week. Apart from competition all the couples danced group Viennese Waltz. Anna & Robert were eliminated.

Week 6: All the couples danced two dances. Olivier Janiak was on the top of the leaderboard, getting 39 out of 40 points for his Quickstep and 36 out of 40 for his Cha-Cha-Cha. Katarzyna & Marcin were eliminated.

Week 7: All the couples danced two new dances. Witold Paszt got 39 out of 40 points for his Paso Doble and it was the highest score in Week 7. Andrzej & Magdalena were eliminated.

Week 8: Both couples performed three dances: their favorite Latin dance, their favorite Ballroom dance and a Freestyle. Both couples got their first perfect scores: Olivier & Kamila for Foxtrot and Freestyle, Witold & Anna for Freestyle. Olivier Janiak became the first winner in the history of the show.

Average chart

Episodes

Week 1
Individual judges scores in charts below (given in parentheses) are listed in this order from left to right: Piotr Galiński, Beata Tyszkiewicz, Zbigniew Wodecki, Iwona Pavlović.

Running order

Week 2
Individual judges scores in charts below (given in parentheses) are listed in this order from left to right: Piotr Galiński, Beata Tyszkiewicz, Iwona Pavlović, Zbigniew Wodecki.

Running order

Week 3
Individual judges scores in charts below (given in parentheses) are listed in this order from left to right: Piotr Galiński, Beata Tyszkiewicz, Iwona Pavlović, Zbigniew Wodecki.

Running order

Week 4
Individual judges scores in charts below (given in parentheses) are listed in this order from left to right: Iwona Pavlović, Zbigniew Wodecki, Beata Tyszkiewicz, Piotr Galiński.

Running order

Week 5
Individual judges scores in charts below (given in parentheses) are listed in this order from left to right: Iwona Pavlović, Zbigniew Wodecki, Beata Tyszkiewicz, Piotr Galiński.

Running order

Week 6
Individual judges scores in charts below (given in parentheses) are listed in this order from left to right: Iwona Pavlović, Zbigniew Wodecki, Beata Tyszkiewicz, Piotr Galiński.

Running order

Week 7
Individual judges scores in charts below (given in parentheses) are listed in this order from left to right: Iwona Pavlović, Zbigniew Wodecki, Beata Tyszkiewicz, Piotr Galiński.

Running order

Week 8: Final
Individual judges scores in charts below (given in parentheses) are listed in this order from left to right: Iwona Pavlović, Zbigniew Wodecki, Beata Tyszkiewicz, Piotr Galiński.

Running order

Non-scored dances

Dance schedule
The celebrities and professional partners danced one of these routines for each corresponding week.
 Week 1: Cha-Cha-Cha or Waltz
 Week 2: Rumba or Quickstep
 Week 3: Jive or Tango
 Week 4: Paso Doble or Foxtrot
 Week 5: Samba & Group Viennese Waltz
 Week 6: Two unlearned dances
 Week 7: Two unlearned dances
 Week 8: Favorite Latin dance, favorite Ballroom dance & Freestyle

Dance chart

 Highest scoring dance
 Lowest scoring dance
 Performed, but not scored

Weekly results
The order is based on the judges' scores combined with the viewers' votes.

 This couple came in first place with the judges.
 This couple came in first place with the judges and gained the highest number of viewers' votes.
 This couple gained the highest number of viewers' votes.
 This couple came in last place with the judges and gained the highest number of viewers' votes.
 This couple came in last place with the judges.
 This couple came in last place with the judges and was eliminated.
 This couple was eliminated.
 This couple won the competition.
 This couple came in second in the competition.
 This couple came in third in the competition.

Audience voting results
The percentage of votes cast by a couple in a particular week is given in parentheses.

Rating figures

References

External links
 Official Site - Taniec z gwiazdami
 Taniec z gwiazdami on Polish Wikipedia

Season 01
2005 Polish television seasons